Hugh of Châteauneuf (1053 – 1 April 1132), also called Hugh of Grenoble, was the Bishop of Grenoble from 1080 to his death. He was a partisan of the Gregorian reform and opposed to the Archbishop of Vienne, later Pope Callixtus II.

Biography

Born at Châteauneuf-sur-Isère, County of Albon to Odilo of Valence, Hugh showed piety and theological facility from a young age. While still a layman, Hugh was made a canon of Valence. His piety was such that it was said of him that he only knew one woman by sight. 

At the Council of Avignon in 1080, he was elected bishop of Grenoble, though he was not yet ordained. The See of Grenoble had fallen into a very poor state and Hugh was selected to be its Gregorian renovator. Conducted by a papal legate to Rome, Hugh was ordained by Pope Gregory VII himself. Upon his return, he immediately set to the task of reforming the abuses in his new diocese. 
When he had succeeded in countering abuse and fostering devotion after two years, he tried to resign his bishopric and enter the Benedictine monastery at Cluny.  However, the Pope ordered him to continue his episcopal work.

For the rest of the 11th century, his episcopate was marked by strife with Count Guigues III of Albon over the possession of ecclesiastic lands in the Grésivaudan, a valley in the French Alps. Hugh alleged that the Count had usurped the lands from the bishopric of Grenoble with the help of Bishop Mallen of Grenoble. An accord was finally reached between Hugh and Count Guigues only in 1099. The Count agreed to cede the disputed territories while Hugh admitted to the Count's temporal authority within the vicinity of Grenoble.

Hugh was also instrumental in the foundation of the Carthusian Order. He received Bruno of Cologne, perhaps his own teacher, and six of his companions in 1084, after seeing them under a banner of seven stars in a dream. Hugh installed the seven in a snowy and rocky Alpine location called Chartreuse. They founded a monastery and devoted their lives to prayer and study, being oft visited by Hugh, who was reported to have adopted much of their way of life.
Hugh also founded the nearby Monastère de Chalais, which grew into an independent order.

Legacy

Hugh was canonised on 22 April 1134 by Pope Innocent II, only two years after his death. His feast day is on 1 April in the Catholic Church. During the French Wars of Religion (between Catholics and Protestants inspired by John Calvin, called "Huguenots"), the Huguenots burned his body.

Sant'Ugo, a Roman titular church, was dedicated to him in 1991. He also gives his name to a church in Greenbelt, Maryland, United States.

References
Notes

Citations

Sources

 Biography of Hugh 

1053 births
1132 deaths
Bishops of Grenoble
Medieval French saints
11th-century French Roman Catholic bishops
12th-century French Roman Catholic bishops
12th-century Christian saints